The Holloways are an English four-piece indie rock band from North London. Their single "Generator" reached number 14 in the UK Singles Chart on 11 June 2007. They have had five No.1 singles on the UK Indie Chart and several Top 40 singles. Their debut album, So This Is Great Britain?, was awarded 8 out of 10 by NME.

Former band member Rob Skipper died on 3 October 2014 in Brighton from a heroin overdose.

Formation
David Jackson and Bryn Fowler established the beginnings of the band, finding Rob Skipper at the live music venue Nambucca on Holloway Road in North London. They would meet later to jam together, playing in future drummer Dave Danger's room (situated above the club). After an hour of jamming, Jackson and Skipper had six songs with guitar and fiddle parts and harmonizing vocals. Impressed by what he heard from the three, Dave Danger joined the band.

They toured with Babyshambles, The Pogues, The Kooks, The Rakes, The Wombats, The Pigeon Detectives and CSS, as well as helping launch careers of Frank Turner, Kid Harpoon and Johnny Lloyd of Tribes inviting them to support on their numerous UK tours.

In 2010, Reservoir Media Management acquired 100% of the Holloways publishing assets which had formerly been administered by TVT Music Enterprises, LLC.

In October 2014, founding member Rob Skipper died of a heroin overdose.

Notable performances
They played at Glastonbury several times during their career including a slot on the Other Stage in 2007. Other festivals included Ibiza Rocks, Summer Sonic Festival in Japan, V Festival, London Calling in Amsterdam and Lovebox Festival in the UK.

Split and post Holloways musical projects
The Holloways announced in 2011 that they were to split. On 23 May 2011, they played their last gig at the Relentless Garage on Holloway Road in London. During the gig the band reunited with previous band members to play a 70-minute set of songs from throughout their career.

HARES
Founding member and lead guitarist went on to front the short-lived folk rock band Rob Skipper & The Musical Differences, and later fronted HARES, whose Coastlines EP was well received by critics, topping the Music Week Top Ten Playlist and making it to XFM's Exposure Top 5 list. HARES have toured the UK extensively with One Night Only, Pigeon Detectives and The Vaccines, have performed at Glastonbury, T in the Park, Hop Farm, Big Reunion and Strummer of Love festivals. Skipper also played fiddle for The Urban Voodoo Machine and Jamie T.

Burning Beaches
Drummer Dave Danger went on to perform with Burning Beaches alongside singer-songwriter and past Holloways guest Sam McCarthy.

Members
David 'Alfie' Jackson – guitars, harmonica, vocals (2004–2011, 2017–2020)
Bryn Fowler – bass, backing vocals (2004–2011, 2017–2020)
Robert Skipper – guitars, fiddle, vocals (2004–2009) 
Dave Danger – drums, triangle (2004–2009, 2020)
Edwin D Harris – drums (2009–2011)
Mike Baker – guitar, backing vocals (2009–2011)

Discography

Albums
 So This is Great Britain? (30 October 2006; special edition: 1 October 2007) No. 54 UK
 No Smoke, No Mirrors (5 October 2009)

EPs
 Sinners & Winners EP (2008)

Singles
 "Generator / Two Left Feet" (2005) Limited release
 "Happiness & Penniless" (2006) Limited release
 "Two Left Feet" (7 August 2006) No. 33 UK, No. 1 UK Independent chart
 "Generator" (16 October 2006) No. 30 UK, No. 1 UK Independent chart
 "Dancefloor" (26 March 2007) No. 41 UK, No. 1 UK Independent chart
 "Generator" (11 June 2007) No. 14 UK, No. 1 UK Independent chart
 "Two Left Feet" (2007) No. 74 UK, No. 1 UK Independent chart
 "Jukebox Sunshine" (2009) No. 4 UK Independent chart

References

External links
 The Holloways on Myspace
 Teenspot Music Review
 Angloplugging Review
 Drownedinsound Review
 NME Review
 Teenspot Music Review
 Angloplugging Review
 Drownedinsound Review
 NME Review

TVT Records artists
English indie rock groups
Musical groups from London
Alumni of Middlesex University